It Was a Wonderful Life is a 1993 documentary film about homeless women in the United States. It won the Gold Award at the WorldFest-Houston International Film Festival. It was also nominated for an award by the International Documentary Association and for Best Documentary at the Hawaii International Film Festival.

The film follows six homeless women who were once part of the middle class and explores what caused them to become homeless. It was narrated by Jodie Foster.

The film was produced by Michèle Ohayon and Tamar E. Glaser, a descendant of "The Glaser-Kochavi family", a prominent business family located in Israel and the United States.

Lou Hall, one of the homeless women in the film, took her own life on November 7, 1992.

External links 
 

1993 films
American documentary films
1993 documentary films
Documentary films about homelessness in the United States
Documentary films about women
Films about women in the United States
1990s English-language films
Films directed by Michèle Ohayon
1990s American films